Saint Didacus of Alcalá Presenting Juan de Herrera's Son to Christ is a c.1606 oil on panel painting by Annibale Carracci, possibly with studio assistance. Probably his last public work, it is now in a chapel of the church of Santa Maria in Monserrato degli Spagnoli in Rome.

History
It was produced as the altarpiece for the Spanish banker Juan Enriquez de Herrera's (1539-1610) family chapel in San Giacomo degli Spagnoli, then Spain's national church in Rome and later rebuilt from scratch to become Nostra Signora del Sacro Cuore. Herrera also commissioned Carracci to decorate the whole chapel, producing designs for frescoes by his students Francesco Albani, Sisto Badalocchio, Giovanni Lanfranco and Domenichino. Work on the chapel started in 1602 as an ex voto for Herrera's son Diego, named after Didacus of Alcalá, both of whom appear in the altarpiece.

The painting and many of the church's other furnishings were taken to Santa Maria in Monserrato when it replaced San Giacomo as the Spanish national church. The Herrera chapel frescoes remained in their original location until the 19th century, when they were divided between the Museu nacional d'art de Catalunya in Barcelona and the Museo del Prado in Madrid.

Autograph status?

Analysis

References

Paintings by Annibale Carracci
Paintings depicting Jesus
Paintings in Rome
Children in art
1606 paintings
Angels in art